Buffy Sainte-Marie: Carry It On is a Canadian documentary film, directed by Madison Thomas and released in 2022. The film is a portrait of the life and career of Indigenous Canadian musician and activist Buffy Sainte-Marie, based in part on Andrea Warner's 2018 biography.

The film premiered at the 2022 Toronto International Film Festival on September 8, 2022.

The film was a nominee for the DGC Allan King Award for Best Documentary Film at the 2022 Directors Guild of Canada awards.

References

External links

2022 films
2022 documentary films
Canadian documentary films
Documentary films about women in music
Documentary films about First Nations
2020s Canadian films